Neopilina rebainsi is a species of monoplacophoran, a superficially limpet-like marine mollusc. The holotype was collected southeast of the Falkland Islands in the Southern Atlantic Ocean. They are dioecious organisms.

References

Monoplacophora
Molluscs described in 1983